Élmer Ramón Ponciano Priego (born 28 June 1978) is a Guatemalan football defender who currently plays for USAC of the Guatemalan Premier Division.

Club career
Ponciano started his professional career at Antigua GFC and had two spells at Guatemalan giants Comunicaciones. He joined newly promoted Peñarol La Mesilla in summer 2009  but left the Huehuetenango side for Zacapa in February 2010 and then moved to his hometown club USAC in June 2010.

International career
He made his debut for Guatemala in a March 2001 friendly match against El Salvador and has earned a total of 19 caps, scoring 1 goal. He has represented his country in 5 FIFA World Cup qualification matches and played at the 2001 and 2007 UNCAF Nations Cup as well as at the 2005 CONCACAF Gold Cup

His final international was a January 2007 UNCAF Cup match against Panama.

References

External links

1978 births
Living people
Sportspeople from Guatemala City
Guatemalan footballers
Guatemala international footballers
2001 UNCAF Nations Cup players
2005 CONCACAF Gold Cup players
2007 UNCAF Nations Cup players
Comunicaciones F.C. players
Deportivo Jalapa players
Deportivo Zacapa players
Copa Centroamericana-winning players
Antigua GFC players
Association football defenders